Ashley Keane (born 20 November 1981 in Camden, London) is an English-American former professional footballer, having played professionally for Torquay United.

Keane joined Torquay on non-contract terms in October 2004. He made his debut on 5 November 2004, starting the Football League Trophy defeat at home to Northampton Town. However, he was substituted midway through the first half for Tony Bedeau, who went on to score Torquay's only goal in a 3–1 defeat. He, along with teammate Bruno Meirelles who had also played and been substituted, was released by a furious Torquay manager, Leroy Rosenior the following day who stated 'I let them play and they weren't good enough'.

References

External links

Living people
1981 births
Footballers from Camden Town
English footballers
Torquay United F.C. players
Association football midfielders